Golub may refer to:

 Golub (film), a 1988 documentary film
 Golub (surname)
 Golub Capital, a credit asset manager
 Golub Corporation, owner of Price Chopper
 Golub-Dobrzyń, a town in Northern Poland
 Golub, one of the towns that became Golub-Dobrzyń
 Golub-Dobrzyń County
 Mount Golub, a mountain in Alaska

See also 
 Gollub (disambiguation)
 Golubović, Serb surname
 Golomb, surname
 Holub, surname